Ilham Udin Armaiyn (born 10 May 1996) is an Indonesian professional footballer who plays as a winger for Liga 1 club Arema.

Club career

Persebaya ISL (Bhayangkara)

On 21 October 2014, Ilham signed a four-year contract with Persebaya ISL (Bhayangkara) to commence ahead of the 2015 Indonesia Super League. He made his debut on 5 April 2015, replacing Rudi Widodo in the 57th minute of a 1–0 victory against Mitra Kukar at Gelora Bung Tomo Stadium.

In the 2017 season, Ilham helped them win the 2017 Liga 1 title, the first trophy of his career.

Selangor FA
On 2 December 2017, Ilham signed a one-year contract with Malaysia Super League club Selangor on a free transfer, along with his national teammates Evan Dimas. He made his first-team debut for Selangor after starting the 2018 Malaysia Super League match against Kuala Lumpur F.A. on 4 February 2018, in which Selangor won 0-2. But, in the 66th minute, Ilham was tackled from behind by one of the opposition's players. He was then unable to continue the match and eventually replaced in the 71st minute.

On 27 July 2018, Ilham scored his first league goal in the 2018 Malaysia Super League for Selangor in a 3–2 loss over Melaka United at the Hang Jebat Stadium.

Return to Bhayangkara
In 2019, it was confirmed that Armaiyn would re-join Liga 1 club Bhayangkara, signing a year contract. He made his league debut on 16 May 2019 by starting in a 1–1 draw against Borneo at the Segiri Stadium, Samarinda. On 21 June, he give assists a opening goal by Flávio Beck Júnior in Bhayangkara's 1–1 away draw over PSS Sleman. During the 2019 season, he only made 14 league appearances and without scoring.

Barito Putera
He was signed for Barito Putera to play in the Liga 1 in the 2020 season.

He made his debut on 29 February 2020, replacing Ambrizal Umanailo in the 80th minute of a 4–0 lost against Madura United at Gelora Ratu Pamelingan Stadium. A month later, this season was suspended on 27 March 2020 due to the COVID-19 pandemic. The season was abandoned and was declared void on 20 January 2021.

PSM Makassar 
On 4 June 2021, Ilham signed for Indonesian Liga 1 club, PSM Makassar. He made his league debut on 5 September by starting in a 1–1 draw against Arema at the Pakansari Stadium, and he also scored his first goal for PSM in the 21st minute. a week later, Ilham scored the opening goal in a 1–1 draw against Madura United. On 23 September, Ilham scored the winning goal in a 2–3 win over Persik Kediri. On 22 October, Ilham give assists a opening goal by Yakob Sayuri in PSM's 2–1 lose over Borneo at Manahan Stadium.

On 28 January 2022, Ilham give another assists a opening goal by Yakob Sayuri in PSM's 2–1 win over PS Barito Putera at Kompyang Sujana Stadium. Ilham had his best performance in the 2021–22 season where he scored 3 goals and 28 league appearances.

Arema 
He was signed for Arema and announced to join the squad on 11 April 2022 with his partner from PSM, Hasyim Kipuw. He also brought Arema back to win the Indonesia President's Cup for the third time. He made his league debut in a 0–3 lost against Borneo Samarinda on 24 July 2022 as a substitute in the 46th minute. Six days later, he scored his first league goal for the club on a 2–1 win over PSIS Semarang, coming on as a substitute, Ilham sparked the momentum of Arema's victory. scored in the 79th minute in a chaotic situation after a corner. On 24 August, Ilham scored the opening goal in a 4–2 win against RANS Nusantara.

On 18 February 2023, coming on as a substitute of second half, Ilham sparked another the momentum of Arema's victory, scoring the winning goal in a 1–0 win against PS Barito Putera.

Career statistics

Club

International

International goals
Scores and results list Indonesia's goal tally first.

Honours

Club
Bhayangkara
 Liga 1: 2017

Arema
 Indonesia President's Cup: 2022

International
Indonesia U-19
 AFF U-19 Youth Championship: 2013
Indonesia
 Aceh World Solidarity Cup runner-up: 2017

References

External links 
 
 

Indonesian footballers
1996 births
Living people
Indonesian Muslims
People from Ternate
Sportspeople from North Maluku
Selangor FA players
Bhayangkara F.C. players
Persebaya Surabaya players
PS Barito Putera players
PSM Makassar players
Arema F.C. players
Liga 1 (Indonesia) players
Malaysia Super League players
Expatriate footballers in Malaysia
Indonesian expatriate sportspeople in Malaysia
Indonesia youth international footballers
Indonesia international footballers
Indonesian expatriate footballers
Association football forwards
Footballers at the 2018 Asian Games
Asian Games competitors for Indonesia